Tereza Voborníková (born  31 May 2000) is a Czech biathlete. She competed at the 2022 Winter Olympics in the Women's pursuit, Women's individual, and Women's sprint.

She competed at the Biathlon Junior World Championships 2019, Biathlon Junior World Championships 2022, and 2020–21 Biathlon IBU Cup.

References

External links 
 Tereza Vobornikova of Team Czech Republic reacts during Women's Lars Baron  - Getty Images

2000 births
Living people
Olympic biathletes of the Czech Republic
Biathletes at the 2022 Winter Olympics
Czech female biathletes
People from Vrchlabí
Sportspeople from the Hradec Králové Region